Mohammad Zahid (born 20 November 1985) is a Pakistani first-class cricketer who plays for Multan cricket team.

References

External links
 

1985 births
Living people
Pakistani cricketers
Multan cricketers
Cricketers from Multan